This is a list of people from Norway involved in sports or athletics.

Summer/all-year

Association football 

Marius Aam, defender
Magnus Aasbrenn, defender
Paal Christian Alsaker, midfielder
Henning Berg, defender, coach, and manager
Tommy Bertheussen, goalkeeper
Daniel Braaten, winger
Thomas Breivik, defender
Gøran van den Burgt, midfielder
John Carew, forward
Lorenzo Caroprese, defender
Nils Arne Eggen, defender, coach, and manager
Mathias Eikenes, forward
Herman Ekeberg, defender
Martin Elvestad, midfielder
Robert Evensen, defender
Torill Fjellestad, defender
Tore André Flo, striker and youth coach
Olav Førli, goalkeeper
Morten Gamst Pedersen, winger
Thomas Gjørtz, defender
Erling Haaland, striker
Vebjørn Hagen, defender
Espen Hagh, midfielder
Trond Hansen, footballer, coach, and manager
Endre Hansen, midfielder
Ørjan Berg Hansen, defender
Åge Hareide, defender, coach, and manager
Ada Hegerberg, striker
Isabell Herlovsen, midfielder and striker
Øystein Hesjedal, defender
Ulf Karlsen, defender
Jørn Karlsrud, midfielder
Edwin Kjeldner, midfielder
Morten Kolseth, defender
Øyvind Leonhardsen, midfielder
Johan Martin Lianes, goalkeeper
Atle Maurud, striker
Aurora Mikalsen, goalkeeper
John Ole Moe, goalkeeper
Torger Motland, striker
Thomas Myhre, goalkeeper
Colin N'kee, forward
Erik Noppi, defender
Gunnar Norebø, midfielder
Jan Økern, footballer
Egil "Drillo" Olsen, winger, coach and manager
Morten-André Olsen, goalkeeper
Jan Petter Olsen, striker
Helge Øvreberg, defender
Lars Øvrebø, midfielder
Arild Rebne, midfielder
Kjetil Rekdal, midfielder, coach, and manager
Bjørn Helge Riise, midfielder
Hege Riise, Olympic footballer
John Arne Riise, left back and midfielder
Karl Erik Rimfeldt, defender
Ludvig Rinde, defender
Torgeir Rugtvedt, defender
Tommy Runar, goalkeeper
Pål Rustadstuen, midfielder
Vegard Sannes, midfielder
Jan Magne Skanke, footballer
Espen Skistad, goalkeeper
Iver Sletten, striker
Trond Sollied, defender and manager
Ole Gunnar Solskjær, forward and manager
Lars Sørlien, midfielder
Tim Henrik Sperrevik, forward
Jens Petter Stang, defender
Ronny Støbakk, midfielder
Pål Anders Stubsveen, footballer
Geir Sundal, defender
Tor Sveen, striker
Erik Thorstvedt, goalkeeper
Thomas Tøllefsen, goalkeeper
Finn-Georg Tomulevski, defender
Frank Tønnesen, defender
Kenneth Trones, defender
Leif Tsolis, coach
Øystein Vetti, defender
Trond Vinterstø, defender
Morten Wivestad, defender

Handball 
Ane Eidem, right back
Sebastian Barthold, left wing
Are Grongstad, handballer
Birgitte Karlsen Hagen, left back
Anja Hammerseng-Edin, central back
Gro Hammerseng-Edin, Olympian, center back
André Jørgensen, left back
Kristian Kjelling, left back
Lars Nordberg, back player
Inga Berit Svestad, right wing
Hermann Vildalen, left back

Rowing 
 Alf Hansen, rower
 Frank Hansen, rower
 Olaf Tufte, rower

Running 
Mensen Ernst, long distance
Ingrid Kristiansen, long distance 
Christina Vukicevic, hurdle race
Grete Waitz, long distance
Susanne Wigene, middle and long distance

Other 

Simen Agdestein, chess player
Bea Ballintijn, swimmer at the 1948 Summer Olympics
Asbjørn Berg-Hansen, flyweight boxer
Edvald Boasson Hagen, cyclist
Henrik Bjørnstad, golfer
Cecilia Brækhus, boxer
Magnus Carlsen, World chess champion
Rune Dalsjø, rally driver
Egil Danielsen, javelin thrower, Olympian
Trygve Diskerud, harness racer
Gunn-Rita Dahle Flesjå, mountain biker, Olympian
Ailo Gaup, FMX motorcyclist
Stian Grimseth, weightlifter
Bente Grønli, multiple Paralympic medallist in swimming and ice sledge racing
Kjell Håkonsen, harness racing coachman
Jon Ludvig Hammer, chess player
Joachim Hansen, MMA fighter
Harald V of Norway, yacht sailor, Olympian
Trine Hattestad, javelin thrower
Knut Holmann, kayaker
Anne Sophie Hunstad, javelin thrower
Thor Hushovd, cyclist
Nila Håkedal, beach volleyball player
Richard Ordemann, taekwondo athlete
Suzann "Tutta" Pettersen, golfer
 Bartosz Piasecki, fencer
Kjersti Plätzer, race walker
Knute Rockne, American college football coach
Jon Rønningen, wrestler
Henning Solberg, rally driver
Petter Solberg, rally driver
Jan Stenerud, American football kicker
Steffen Tangstad, heavy weight boxer
Andreas Thorkildsen, javelin thrower
Sune Wentzel, flying disc athlete
Babe Didriksen Zaharias, Olympic athlete and LPGA golfer

Winter sports

Curling
Linn Githmark, curler
Dordi Nordby, curler
Pål Trulsen, curler
Thomas Ulsrud, curler

Ice hockey 
Mats Zuccarello Aasen (born 1987), winger
Jørn Goldstein (born 1953), goalie, player at the 1984 Winter Olympics
Espen "Shampoo" Knutsen (born 1972), retired centre, now manager
Patrick Thoresen, winger, player at the 2010 and 2014 Winter Olympics
Ole-Kristian Tollefsen, defenceman, player at the 2010 Winter Olympics
Tore Vikingstad, retired centre

Skiing 
Hans Anton Aalien, blind cross-country skier
Kjetil André Aamodt, alpine skier
Geir Ludvig Aasen Ouren, cross-country skier
Thomas Alsgaard, cross-country skier
Berit Aunli, cross-country skier
Anders Bardal, ski jumper, Olympic Team Bronze Medal
Marit Bjørgen, cross-country skier
Oddvar Brå, cross-country skier
Espen Bredesen, ski jumper
Bjørn Dæhlie, cross-country skier
Bjørn Einar Romøren, ski jumper
Stein Eriksen, alpine skier
Frode Estil, cross-country skier
Johan Remen Evensen, ski jumper, Olympic Team Bronze Medal
Kristin Fridtun, ski jumper
Tord Asle Gjerdalen, cross-country skier
Kim-Roar Hansen, ski jumper
Tom Hilde, ski jumper, Olympic Team Bronze Medal
Odd-Bjørn Hjelmeset, cross-country skier
Anders Jacobsen, ski jumper, Olympic Team Bronze Medal
Lasse Kjus, alpine skier
Frode Lillefjell, cross-country skier and coach
Roar Ljøkelsøy, ski jumper
Ingolf Mork, ski jumper
Sondre Norheim, pioneering alpine skier
Petter Northug, double Olympic Gold cross- country skier
Simen Østensen, cross-country skier
Hilde G. Pedersen, cross-country skier
Øystein Pettersen, cross-country skier
Sigurd Pettersen, ski jumper
Kathrine Rokke, cross-country skier
Birger Ruud, ski jumper
Oddvar Saga, ski jumper
Bente Skari, cross-country skier
Kristen Skjeldal, cross-country skier
Vegard Sklett, ski jumper
Herman Smith-Johannsen, supercentenarian Norwegian-Canadian skiing pioneer
John A. "Snowshoe" Thompson, Norwegian-American skiing pioneer
Ole Martin Storlien, Nordic combined skier
Kari Traa, freestyle skier
Vegard Ulvang, cross-country skier
Bjørn Wirkola, ski jumper

Snowboarding 
Kjersti Buaas, bronze medal at the 2006 Winter Olympics women's competition
Daniel Franck, silver medal at the 1998 Winter Olympics men's competition
Terje Håkonsen, professional freestyle snowboarder active in the 1990s
Torstein Horgmo, professional snowboarder 
Stine Brun Kjeldaas, silver medal at the 1998 Winter Olympics women's competition
Silje Norendal, professional snowboarder, participant at the 2014 Winter Olympics

Speed skating 

Roald Aas
Hjalmar Andersen
Ivar Ballangrud
Eskil Ervik
Bernt Evensen
Rolf Falk-Larssen
Sverre Farstad
Per Willy Guttormsen
Øystein Grødum
Finn Helgesen
Bjørg Eva Jensen
Knut Johannesen
Geir Karlstad
Johann Olav Koss
Fred Anton Maier
Oscar Mathisen
Per Ivar Moe
Sten Stensen
Jan Egil Storholt
Ådne Søndrål
Magne Thomassen
Even Wetten

Other 
Ole Einar Bjørndalen, biathlete
Sonja Henie, figure skater and movie star
Tore Johannessen, president of the Norwegian Ice Hockey Association
Axel Paulsen, figure skater
Liv Grete Skjelbreid Poirée, biathlete
Robert Sørlie, dogsled racer

See also 
 Lists of sportspeople

Sport
Norwegian